Falsimargarita benthicola is a species of sea snail, a marine gastropod mollusk in the family Calliostomatidae.

Description
The height of the shell attains 21 mm.

Distribution
This marine species occurs off the Drake Passage, Antarctica, at depths between 3010 m and 3510 m.

References

 Dell, R. K. (1990). Antarctic Mollusca with special reference to the fauna of the Ross Sea. Bulletin of the Royal Society of New Zealand, Wellington 27: 1–311 page(s): 97
 Engl W. (2012) Shells of Antarctica. Hackenheim: Conchbooks. 402 pp.

External links
 

benthicola
Gastropods described in 1990
Fauna of the Southern Ocean